Daodong Tutorial Academy is a former tutorial academy during the Qing Dynasty rule of Taiwan in Hemei Township, Changhua County, Taiwan.

History
The academy was founded in 1857. Recently, the building underwent renovation; the pillars and columns were replaced and the façade was restored to its original look.

Architecture

The academy building consists of a central hall, east wing, west wing, and a garden. The central hall enshrines Chu Wen-kung and Kuei Hsing; the east wing enshrines the tablets of temple renovation contributors; and the west wing enshrines the God of the Land. The garden displays wooden logs used for the construction of the academy.

See also
 List of tourist attractions in Taiwan

References

1857 establishments in Taiwan
Academies in Taiwan
Buildings and structures in Changhua County
Hemei Township
National monuments of Taiwan
Tourist attractions in Changhua County